"Winter" is a 2010 single from Unheilig.  There are two versions, a standard two-track single and a limited edition disc with a poster included. It is the ninth single to be released from Unheilig.

Video
The video for Winter made its premier on Unheilig's official site on November 5, 2010.

Track listing

Charts

Year-end charts

Certifications

References

2010 singles
2010 songs
Unheilig songs